Wojakowa  is a village in the administrative district of Gmina Iwkowa, within Brzesko County, Lesser Poland Voivodeship, in southern Poland.

The village has a population of 1,063.

References

Wojakowa